Adam Joseph Copeland (born October 30, 1973), better known by the ring name Edge, is a Canadian professional wrestler and actor. He is currently signed to WWE, where he performs on the Raw brand. Regarded as one of the greatest professional wrestlers of all time, he has won a total of 31 championships in his WWE career.

After making his professional wrestling debut in 1992, Copeland wrestled in various independent promotions, competing in singles and tag-team competition, the latter with long-time friend Christian. In 1997, he signed a developmental deal with the World Wrestling Federation (WWF, now WWE) and made his televised debut in 1998 under the ring name Edge. After winning the WWF Intercontinental Championship in 1999, Edge formed a tag team with Christian, and the two won the World Tag Team Championship on seven occasions. During this time, they gained notoriety due to their participation in Tables, Ladders, and Chairs matches. They are considered one of the major teams that revived tag team wrestling during the Attitude Era. Edge split with Christian in 2001 and embarked on a successful solo career. He has won the second-most championships in WWE history with 31, holding the World Heavyweight Championship a record seven times, the WWE Championship four times, the Intercontinental Championship five times, the United States Championship once, the World Tag Team Championship a record 12 times, and the WWE Tag Team Championship twice. He is WWE's 14th Triple Crown Champion and 7th Grand Slam Champion. He won the 2001 King of the Ring tournament, the 2005 (and first) Money in the Bank ladder match, and 2010 Royal Rumble match, making him the first wrestler to achieve all three.

Edge retired in 2011 due to several neck injuries, and was inducted into the WWE Hall of Fame the following year. Nine years after retiring, he returned to competition as a surprise entrant in the 2020 Royal Rumble match and won the next year's Royal Rumble, becoming the eighth man to win the Royal Rumble twice, the third to win it as the first entrant, and the first to win it after being inducted into the WWE Hall of Fame. He has headlined multiple PPV events for WWE, including WrestleMania XXIV and WrestleMania 37, and is one of the company's most prolific PPV performers.

Aside from professional wrestling, Copeland has acted in the films Highlander: Endgame and Bending the Rules. He has made guest appearances on television shows such as Weakest Link, Mind of Mencia, Deal or No Deal, MADtv, and The Flash. He played Dwight Hendrickson on the Syfy series Haven in 2015 and Ketill Flatnose in Vikings (2017–2020). He is also scheduled to appear as Ares in the Disney+ series Percy Jackson and the Olympians.

Early life 
Adam Joseph Copeland was born in Orangeville, Ontario, on October 30, 1973, the son of Judy Lynn Copeland (1953–2018), a single mother who worked two jobs to support him. He has claimed to have never met his father, or even seen a picture of him. He became interested in professional wrestling at a young age; his favorite wrestlers included Mr. Perfect, Randy Savage, Hulk Hogan, Ricky Steamboat, Shawn Michaels, and Bret Hart. He met fellow future wrestler Jason "Christian" Reso in Orangeville when he was 10 years old, and they would make the trip to Maple Leaf Gardens in Toronto to watch their favorite wrestlers; at the age of 16, Copeland attended WrestleMania VI at the Toronto SkyDome in 1990, sitting in the 11th row at ringside. He was cheering on WWF World Heavyweight Champion Hulk Hogan against The Ultimate Warrior, and he credits this match with making him realize he wanted to be a wrestler. When he was 17, he won an essay writing contest hosted by his local gym, the prize for which was free wrestling training with Sweet Daddy Siki and Ron Hutchison in Toronto. However, he put his wrestling aspirations aside to help his mother pay the bills, taking numerous jobs and then receiving a diploma in radio broadcasting from Humber College before resuming his wrestling training.

Professional wrestling career

Early career (1992–1995) 
Copeland made his professional wrestling debut on Canada Day 1992, in an event at Monarch Park Stadium in Toronto. Throughout the 1990s, Copeland wrestled on the independent circuit in Ontario and the Great Lakes region of the United States under the ring name Sexton Hardcastle. He became a part of the tag team Sex and Violence with Joe E. Legend. In the mid-1990s, he wrestled as Adam Impact for Tony Condello's Winnipeg promotion. In 1997, Sex and Violence became part of a larger stable called Thug Life, joining Christian Cage, Zakk Wyld, Bill Skullion, and Rhino Richards. During his independent career, he won the MWCW Tag Team Championship twice with Legend and the ICW Street Fight Tag Team Championship twice.

The duo of Hardcastle and Cage were known as Hard Impact before changing their name to The Suicide Blondes. They also worked in Japan under the name The Canadian Rockers. Copeland also wrestled briefly as Damian Striker (presented on-screen as Damon Striker, something which Edge disputed in 2021) against Meng on an episode of WCW Pro in February 1996. In the summer of 1995, he worked a show in Ajax, Ontario, where Bret Hart's business manager, Carl De Marco, was watching. Impressed, he suggested Copeland send an audition tape to the World Wrestling Federation (WWF). Copeland did not hear back from WWF, but some time later, De Marco was appointed President of WWF Canada and told Copeland that he'd put in a good word.

World Wrestling Federation/Entertainment/WWE

Early years (1996–1998) 
On May 10, 1996, Copeland replaced Bob Holly's opponent on short notice in the opening match of a WWF house show as Sexton Hardcastle in Hamilton, Ontario.

In 1996, Copeland initially made $210 per week while working for the WWF without an official contract. The company also paid for his outstanding college debt, which was around $40,000. After a Grand Prix Wrestling tour in the summer of 1997, De Marco urged Copeland to go to Calgary, where Hart was informally training wrestlers while recovering from knee surgery. He spent his tour earnings on a plane ticket and landed with no money or place to stay. He called Johnny Smith, whom he met twice, and Smith agreed to give him food and shelter. Smith also drove Copeland to and from the gym and Hart's house, where he trained alongside Ken Shamrock, Test, Mark Henry and Kurrgan. Copeland returned to the Maritimes for another Grand Prix tour before going back to Hart's house, bringing Christian with him. After this camp, Hart was impressed enough to put in a good word for both men at the WWF.

Copeland received a developmental contract with the WWF in 1997. His first match was on November 10, 1997 in Ottawa, Ontario losing to CFL football star Glen Kulka. The next day in Cornwall, Ontario, he faced and defeated Christian Cage at Shotgun taping in a dark match, this match is included on WWE Home Video's 2008 retrospective, Edge: A Decade of Decadence. Form March to June 1998, Copeland appeared in many house shows and dark matches. Upon completing his training, Copeland made his WWF television debut on the June 22, 1998 episode of Raw as Edge, a loner character who entered the arena through the crowd for his matches. This had been preceded by weeks of vignettes for the character, which included him aimlessly walking around darkened city streets and assaulting innocent pedestrians. Copeland took the name Edge from an Albany radio station.

Edge's first televised match was on June 16 (aired June 22) against Jose Estrada Jr., which ended prematurely by countout when Edge performed a somersault senton from the ring to the outside, legitimately injuring Estrada's neck. In his first pay-per-view match at SummerSlam on August 30, he served as Sable's mystery tag team partner defeating Jacqueline and Marc Mero, and slammed Sable onto Mero in a pinning position to pick up the win. At Breakdown: In Your House on September 27, Edge faced Owen Hart in a losing effort making it his first loss on WWF TV. On the October 11 edition of Sunday Night Heat, Edge defeated Vader in Vader's final televised WWF match and at WWF Capital Carnage on December 6, Edge faced Tiger Ali Singh in a losing effort.

Teaming with Christian (1998–2001) 

Edge was then placed in a feud against the vampire wrestler Gangrel. During the feud, Gangrel introduced Christian, Edge's storyline brother, as his ally. Eventually, Gangrel and Christian convinced Edge to join them, and the three of them formed an alliance known as The Brood. At Rock Bottom: In Your House on December 13, The Brood defeated The J.O.B. Squad in a six-man tag team match. At the Royal Rumble on January 24, 1999, Edge competed in the 30-man Royal Rumble match and was eliminated by Road Dogg. The Brood was later abducted and converted into The Undertaker's Ministry of Darkness. In May 1999, the Brood broke away from the Ministry after Christian was attacked by Ken Shamrock and forced to reveal the location of the captive Stephanie McMahon. The Undertaker chose to have Christian punished for his trespass, but Edge and Gangrel stood by him and betrayed The Undertaker, leading to a brief feud with the Ministry. At Backlash: In Your House on April 25, the Brood faced Ministry members Bradshaw, Faarooq, and Mideon in a losing effort. At King of the Ring on June 27, The Hardy Boyz defeated Edge and Christian in a match to determine the number one contender to the WWF Tag Team Championship, after their first match on Sunday Night Heat ended in a no-contest.

Edge captured his first singles championship, the WWF Intercontinental Championship, on July 24, 1999, defeating Jeff Jarrett at a house show in Toronto, Ontario. Interestingly, the match wasn't booked this way. Edge explained in an interview in 2021 with Loudwire: "During the match we did this thing where I pinned [Jeff Jarrett] and the crowd thought I won and then they were gonna reverse it, but then Jack Lanza, who was the road agent at the time, walked out and said, ‘Go get your belt.’ I went, ‘Whaaaa?’ We’re calling an audible here!”

He lost the title the next night to Jarrett at Fully Loaded on July 25. At SummerSlam on August 22, Edge and Christian competed in a Tag team turmoil match where they eliminated three teams: The Hardy Boyz, Mideon and Viscera, and Droz and Prince Albert before getting eliminated from the match by The Acolytes. At Unforgiven on September 26, Edge and Christian faced The New Age Outlaws for the WWF Tag Team Championship but failed to win the titles.

Later in the year, he was placed in a storyline angle with The Hardy Boyz. Gangrel soon betrayed both Edge and Christian and formed The New Brood with their enemies, The Hardy Boyz. They feuded with the Hardy Boyz, as they went on to compete in a ladder match at No Mercy on October 17 for the "managerial services" of Terri Runnels and $100,000, which the Hardy Boyz won. The match was widely praised and described as the match of the year by various reviewers. At Survivor Series on November 14, Edge and Christian and The Hardy Boyz faced Too Cool and The Hollys in a four-on-four Survivor Series elimination match where they lost. At Armageddon on December 12, Edge and Christian competed in an 8-team battle royal which was won by The Acolytes. At the Royal Rumble on January 23, 2000, Edge competed in the Royal Rumble match where he was eliminated by Al Snow and Val Venis. At No Way Out on February 27, Edge and Christian defeated The Hardy Boyz in a tag team match to determine the number one contenders to the WWF Tag Team Championship. At WrestleMania 2000 on April 2, Edge and Christian defeated the Hardy Boyz and the Dudley Boyz to win the WWF Tag Team Championship in a Triangle Ladder match, which ultimately led to the creation of the Tables, Ladders, and Chairs match.

Following this victory, Edge and Christian found success as a heel duo, winning the WWF Tag Team Championship six more times. During this time, their trademark became the "five second pose" where they performed a pose in the ring for five seconds "for the benefit of those with flash photography" to mock, insult, or otherwise amuse the fans. At Backlash on April 30, Edge and Christian defeated D-Generation X to retain the titles. At Judgment Day on May 21, Edge, Christian and Kurt Angle lost a six-man tag team match to Rikishi and Too Cool. Soon after, they lost the tag titles to Too Cool but won them back in a Four corners elimination match at King of the Ring on June 25. At Fully Loaded on July 23, they defended the titles against The Acolytes Protection Agency where they got disqualified but retained the titles. After retaining the titles at SummerSlam on August 27, at Unforgiven on September 24, Edge and Christian defended the titles against The Hardy Boyz in a steel cage match where they lost the titles and were not allowed another title shot. At No Mercy on October 22, Edge and Christian, masked as Los Conquistadores, defeated The Hardys for the titles. The next night on Raw, the Hardy Boyz dressed as the Los Conquistadores and defeated Edge in a handicap match after Christian was taken out backstage to regain the WWF Tag Team Championship.

At Survivor Series on November 19, Edge and Christian teamed with Right to Censor's Bull Buchanan and The Goodfather in a four-on-four Survivor Series elimination match, where they lost to The Dudley Boyz and The Hardy Boyz, They regained the tag titles at Armageddon on December 10 in a fatal four-way match, but lost them eight days later to The Rock and The Undertaker. They won them back three days later on SmackDown! thanks to special guest referee Kurt Angle. During Edge and Christian's run as a tag team, they also competed as a team in the first three TLC matches, winning the first two over The Dudley Boyz and The Hardy Boyz, at SummerSlam in 2000 and then again at WrestleMania X-Seven. At the Royal Rumble on January 21, 2001, Edge and Christian were defeated by the Dudley Boyz and lost the tag team titles. They unsuccessfully attempted to regain the tag team title at No Way Out on February 25 against the Dudley Boyz and The Brothers of Destruction, but they succeeded at WrestleMania X-Seven on April 1 against the Dudley Boyz and The Hardyz in the second TLC match. At Judgment Day on May 20, Edge and Christian competed in a Tag Team Turmoil match which was won by Chris Jericho and Chris Benoit. Days later on the May 24 SmackDown!, Edge and Christian competed in a Fatal 4-Way Tag Team TLC Match for the WWF Tag Team Championship where Benoit and Jericho retained the titles.

Championship reigns and various feuds (2001–2003) 
Edge solidified himself as an emerging singles competitor by winning the 2001 King of the Ring tournament and becoming a face by siding with the WWF during the Invasion storyline. Christian betrayed Edge shortly afterward, and the two feuded over Edge's Intercontinental Championship (which he won at SummerSlam on August 19) that he later lost to Christian at Unforgiven on September 23, though Edge later captured the title in a ladder match at No Mercy on October 21. Following this, Edge lost the Intercontinental Championship to Test on the November 5 episode of Raw and shortly afterwards won the WCW United States Championship from Kurt Angle on the November 12 episode of Raw. Edge defeated Test at Survivor Series on November 18 to regain the Intercontinental Championship with the United States Championship. From there, Edge was placed in a feud with William Regal for the Intercontinental Championship. Edge first defeated Regal at Vengeance on December 9 to retain the championship: however, he would come up short in the new year, losing the title to Regal at the Royal Rumble on January 20, 2002, and then coming up short in his rematch against Regal at No Way Out on February 17 in a Brass Knuckles on a Pole match. At WrestleMania X8 on March 17, Edge found himself in a match with Booker T that was the result of Edge beating out Booker for a fictitious Japanese shampoo endorsement. Shortly after defeating Booker at WrestleMania, Edge was drafted to the SmackDown! brand in the first WWF Draft Lottery. During this time, Edge also gained Never Gonna Stop (The Red Red Kroovy) by Rob Zombie as his new entrance theme.

Upon arriving there, he began a feud with Kurt Angle. At Backlash on April 21, Angle defeated Edge which later culminated in Edge shaving Angle's head following a hair vs. hair match at Judgment Day on May 19. On the May 30 episode of SmackDown!, Edge defeated Angle in a steel cage match to end the feud but during the match Edge speared Angle from the top rope. In the process, Edge injured his arm and would be forced out of action for a month. Two months later, he would end up winning the WWE Tag Team Championship alongside Hollywood Hulk Hogan on the July 4 episode of SmackDown! by defeating Billy and Chuck. Edge and Hogan lost the titles at Vengeance on July 21 to The Un-Americans (Lance Storm and Christian), and at SummerSlam on August 25, Edge defeated Eddie Guerrero then lost to Guerrero at Unforgiven on September 22. They met one final time days later on SmackDown! in a No Disqualification match where Edge won, ending the feud. He then formed a tag team with Rey Mysterio, and the two participated in a tournament for the newly created and SmackDown!-exclusive WWE Tag Team Championship. They lost to Kurt Angle and Chris Benoit in the finals of the tournament at No Mercy on October 20; the match was voted Match of the Year by the Wrestling Observer Newsletter. After they failed in winning the titles, Mysterio and Edge defeated Los Guerreros in a number one contender's match on the October 24 episode of SmackDown! to earn a title shot. At the Rebellion pay-per-view on October 26, Edge faced Brock Lesnar and Paul Heyman in a Handicap match for the WWE Championship where Lesnar retained the title after Lesnar pinned Edge. On the November 7 episode of SmackDown!, they defeated Angle and Benoit in a two out-of-three falls match to win the WWE Tag Team Championship. They soon lost the tag titles to Los Guerreros in a triple threat elimination match that also involved former champions Angle and Benoit at Survivor Series on November 17.

After losing the title, Edge and Mysterio went their separate ways to focus on their singles careers. At the Royal Rumble, Edge competed in the 30-man Royal Rumble match on January 19, 2003, where he had three eliminations before getting eliminated by Chris Jericho. Edge then teamed up with Chris Benoit, facing Team Angle in a series of singles and tag team matches. Prior to No Way Out, Edge suffered a legitimate neck injury, rendering him unable to compete in his scheduled match. The injury stemmed from a bump he took on a closed ladder on the September 26, 2002 edition of SmackDown! while wrestling Eddie Guerrero, who then frog splashed him while he was still laying on the ladder. His arms would then numb more and more in the following months before deciding to have the surgery, as he was gradually in more pain and did not want to risk dropping an opponent dangerously because of his numb arms. At No Way Out on February 23, Edge was written off television through a backstage attack. He then underwent surgery with Dr. Lloyd Youngblood and was sidelined for over a year.

World championship pursuits (2004–2005) 
Edge was drafted to the Raw brand in the 2004 WWE draft lottery on March 22, 2004, where he speared Eric Bischoff and returned to in-ring action shortly after the event. At Backlash on April 18, Edge defeated Kane, and on the April 19 episode of Raw, he and World Heavyweight Champion Chris Benoit won the World Tag Team Championship from Batista and Ric Flair. They continued a close partnership even after losing the title; at Bad Blood on June 13, Edge and Benoit defeated La Résistance (who defeated them for the titles on the May 31 episode of Raw) in a match for the World Tag Team Championship by disqualification but did not win the titles. The team disbanded when Edge won the Intercontinental Championship at Vengeance on July 11 defeating Randy Orton, thus becoming a five time Intercontinental Champion. At SummerSlam on August 15, Edge defeated Chris Jericho and Batista in a triple threat match to retain the Intercontinental Championship. Following a legitimate groin injury in a non-televised match, Raw General Manager Eric Bischoff stripped Edge of the Intercontinental title on the September 6 episode of Raw.

Upon his return, Edge began to pursue the World Heavyweight Championship, while also beginning a slow heel turn. Edge, Chris Benoit, and Shawn Michaels received a title shot for Triple H's World Heavyweight Championship at Taboo Tuesday on October 19. Michaels won the audience vote to receive the title shot, giving Edge and Benoit a tag team title shot against La Résistance. They regained the titles. During the match, an angry Edge abandoned his partner and instead interfered in the World Heavyweight Championship match, costing Michaels the championship. On the November 1 episode of Raw, Edge and Benoit lost the World Tag Team Championship back to La Résistance with Edge abandoning Benoit again and sitting in a chair and watching the match. After the conclusion of the match, Edge attacked Benoit, turning heel in the process. Edge would then become cocky and brash, while also becoming more vicious and destructive than ever before. Edge would also gain a new entrance theme, Metalingus, performed by then-newly established band, Alter Bridge. At Survivor Series on November 14, Edge was part of Team Triple H along with Triple H, Batista, and Gene Snitsky. They were defeated by Team Orton (Randy Orton, Chris Benoit, Chris Jericho, and Maven). During the match, Edge eliminated both Benoit and Jericho before getting eliminated by Orton.

On the November 29 episode of Raw, both Edge and Benoit competed in a number one contender's battle royal, but they eliminated each other simultaneously at the conclusion of the match, resulting in a draw. As a result, Triple H was forced to defend the title in a triple threat match. In the match, Benoit locked the Crippler Crossface on Edge, who shifted his weight putting Benoit's shoulders on the mat for a pin. This match also ended in a draw for Benoit and Edge, as Benoit made Edge submit at the same time the referee counted a pinfall for Edge. As a result, the World Heavyweight title was vacated the following week on Raw. On January 9, 2005, Edge competed in his first Elimination Chamber match at New Year's Revolution for the vacant World Heavyweight Championship. Special guest referee Shawn Michaels performed a superkick on Edge, in retaliation for an accidental spear by Edge, causing Edge to be the first eliminated. This led to a match at the Royal Rumble on January 30, in which Edge defeated Michaels. Edge also competed in the Royal Rumble match later that night, where he lasted until the final three but was eliminated by Batista and John Cena.

WWE Champion (2005–2006) 
At WrestleMania 21 on April 3, Edge won the first ever Money in the Bank ladder match, gaining a contract that gave him a shot at the World Heavyweight Championship within one year. According to a podcast interview with Chris Jericho, Copeland said that he did not initially like the idea of the ladder match and even told WWE management not to include him on the WrestleMania 21 card altogether. However, he was talked into competing by the other participants like Jericho and Glenn Jacobs who said the match had the potential to be a big success. At Backlash on May 1, Edge defeated Chris Benoit in a Last Man Standing match to end the feud. Several weeks after, Edge was then paired with Lita, his real-life girlfriend at the time, in an angle in which she betrayed her storyline husband Kane, by costing him the Gold Rush tournament finals match to determine the number-one contender for the World Heavyweight Championship on the May 16 episode of Raw. The next week, Edge received his World Heavyweight Championship match against Batista, which he lost. Edge started a feud with Kane leading to several matches between them including one at Vengeance on June 26, when Edge lost to Kane. After trading several victories on Raw, the feud ended in a stretcher match on the July 25 episode of Raw that Edge won, but shortly after, Kane performed a tombstone piledriver on Lita and later abducted her in an ambulance.

On the July 11 episode of Raw, Edge's match with Kane was interrupted when Matt Hardy made a surprise appearance. Hardy referred to Edge by his real name and issued a threat to Lita as well. When Hardy was officially brought back to Raw, he and Edge continued their feud, including a match at SummerSlam on August 21 where Edge defeated Hardy, causing Hardy to have excessive blood loss. A week later on Raw, after a match Hardy had with Rob Conway, Edge then appeared and overpowered Hardy. He then wedged Hardy's head between the steel steps and the ringpost, and then kicked the steel steps into Hardy's head. On the August 29 episode of Raw, Edge and Hardy fought in a Street Fight, which resulted in a no contest when Hardy performed a side effect on Edge off the entrance ramp into the sound speakers and other electrical equipment. They also fought in a Steel cage match at Unforgiven on September 18 in which Hardy defeated Edge. The feud culminated in a Loser Leaves Raw ladder match on Raw Homecoming on October 3, which Edge won. After the match, Hardy left the Raw brand to go to the SmackDown! brand, while Edge suffered a legit torn pectoralis major muscle that kept him shelved for a couple of months. During his time off, he starred in his own talk show segment on Raw entitled The Cutting Edge, dubbing himself the "Rated-R Superstar". Edge used his talk show to start a feud with Ric Flair following Flair's well-publicized arrest in connection with a road rage incident. Edge eventually began using The Cutting Edge as a soapbox to run down Flair until, after weeks of public mockery, Flair eventually showed up and attacked Edge. Edge and Flair formally met at the New Year's Revolution event on January 8, 2006 in a match for Flair's Intercontinental Championship, which resulted in Flair retaining after Edge was disqualified.

Although Edge had lost his scheduled match at New Year's Revolution, that would not be his only match that evening as the main event saw John Cena, the reigning WWE Champion, defend his title in an Elimination Chamber match. After a bloody Cena won the match, WWE Chairman Vince McMahon revealed that Edge was cashing in his Money in the Bank contract to face Cena for the championship immediately. After two spears, Edge quickly defeated Cena to win the WWE Championship, marking his first world title win. 

The following night on Raw, Edge decided to celebrate his victory by having "hot, unbridled sex" in the middle of the ring. He and Lita engaged in foreplay until they were interrupted by Flair, who called Edge a disgrace and "that he was horrible in the sack". Flair, however, ended up on the receiving end of a con-chair-to on the announcers' table until Cena came out to Flair's aid and performed an FU on Lita. The "Live Sex Celebration" segment earned Raw a 5.2 rating, the highest Raw rating in over a year, leading Edge to call himself the "most watched champion ever". On the January 16 episode of Raw, Edge defeated Ric Flair in a TLC match to retain the WWE Championship. At the Royal Rumble on January 29, Edge lost the WWE Championship back to Cena.

Edge then lost a rematch on the February 16 episode of Raw and blamed special guest referee Mick Foley for his loss, claiming biased officiating and attacked him. At Saturday Night's Main Event XXXII, Foley got revenge on Edge by assaulting him with a con-chair-to. They feuded until WrestleMania 22 on April 2, where a heavily bloodied, abrasion and thumbtack-covered Edge defeated Foley in a hardcore match (which involved spots involving barbed wire and other metallic objects) by Spearing him through a flaming table but suffered second degree burns, thanks to anti-flame material not being applied to the table, at both wrestlers' request. Following his feud with Foley, Edge once again challenged John Cena for the WWE Championship. Triple H was involved in a feud with Cena at the time, resulting in a triple threat match at Backlash on April 30, where Cena pinned Triple H to retain the title. After Backlash, Edge continued his feud with Mick Foley as they entered a triple threat hardcore match with Tommy Dreamer on the May 8 episode of Raw. Foley, however, betrayed his friend Dreamer with Edge's assistance. Edge and Foley then proclaimed that, because of their brutal match at WrestleMania, they were the true Hardcore Champions. At ECW One Night Stand on June 11, Edge, Foley and Lita defeated Dreamer, Terry Funk and Beulah McGillicutty in an Extreme Rules tag team match. Later in the event, Edge interfered in the WWE Championship match between John Cena and challenger Rob Van Dam, helping Van Dam win the title after he speared Cena through a table.

Edge, who won a number one contender's match to face Van Dam for the WWE Championship, was unable to win their match at Vengeance on June 25. On the July 3 episode of Raw, Edge pinned Van Dam in a triple threat match, after blindsiding Cena with the title belt, to become WWE Champion for the second time. This angle re-ignited Edge's feud with Cena, and he lost by disqualification at Saturday Night's Main Event XXXIII in order to retain the title. Subsequently, a match was made for the August event SummerSlam with the stipulation that if Edge disqualified himself, he would lose the title. At SummerSlam on August 20, Edge retained the title by pinning Cena after he hit him in the back of the head with a pair of brass knuckles when the referee was not looking. The night after SummerSlam, Lita disposed of Cena's customized "spinner" belt into the Long Island Sound at Edge's command, who declared it the end of the "Cena era" in his life. Edge later unveiled the new "Rated-R" version of the belt. Cena, however, interfered in Edge's match with a returning Jeff Hardy later that night, chasing him down to the outside of the building, assaulting him, and tossing Edge into the Long Island Sound. The following week, Cena made a deal with Edge: if Edge could defeat him in a match for the WWE Championship, he would sign a contract to move to SmackDown!. Edge accepted, on the condition the match be a TLC match held at September's Unforgiven event in Edge's home town of Toronto. At Unforgiven on September 17, he lost the WWE Championship after Cena performed the FU on him, sending Edge crashing through two stacked tables from a ladder. At one point during the match, Cena locked in a modified STF while Edge was in a ladder, who later said he was legitimately choked unconscious, the first time he had been knocked out in a match during his career.

Rated-RKO (2006–2007) 

On the October 2 episode of Raw, interference from the newly reformed D-Generation X (DX) (Triple H and Shawn Michaels) cost Edge his "final chance" at John Cena's WWE Championship in a Steel cage match, though their interference was a response to the interference of Lance Cade and Trevor Murdoch. It led to Edge approaching Randy Orton and asking him to join forces to defeat DX, which Orton accepted and joined an alliance with Edge. The two formed the tag team Rated-RKO. At Cyber Sunday on November 5, Rated-RKO defeated DX with Eric Bischoff as the special guest referee. On the November 13 episode of Raw, Rated-RKO defeated Ric Flair and Roddy Piper to win the World Tag Team Championship, making Edge a record eleven-time tag team champion. At Survivor Series on November 26, Rated-RKO teamed with Johnny Nitro, Mike Knox and Gregory Helms to face Team DX (Triple H, Shawn Michaels, CM Punk, Matt Hardy and Jeff Hardy) in a Survivor Series match, but lost when all members of Team Rated-RKO were eliminated in a clean sweep. Also that month, Lita retired, and her on-screen relationship with Edge abruptly ended, with no explanation.

As part of the storyline angle, Rated-RKO attacked Ric Flair with steel chairs to enrage DX on the November 27 episode of Raw. At New Year's Revolution on January 7, 2007, Rated-RKO defended the World Tag Team Championship against DX, but the match was declared a no-contest when Triple H suffered a legitimate injury during the match. At the Royal Rumble on January 28, Edge competed in the 30-man Royal Rumble match where he lasted the longest in the match with a time of 44 minutes, eliminating 5 men and making it to the final 4 in the match before getting eliminated by Shawn Michaels. With Triple H out of action, the team continued their on-screen rivalry with remaining DX member Shawn Michaels. Michaels teamed with John Cena to defeat Rated-RKO for the World Tag Team Championship on January 29, 2007. Edge and Orton suffered a series of losses to Cena and Michaels in the following months. Edge competed in the Money in the Bank ladder match at WrestleMania 23 on April 1 in a losing effort. During the match, Matt Hardy threw him onto a ladder and encouraged Jeff Hardy, who was close to the winning briefcase, to finish him off. Hardy then leaped off the 20-foot-high (6.1 m) ladder, and drove him through the ladder with a leg drop, seemingly injuring both Edge and himself. The two were unable to continue the match and were removed from ringside on stretchers.  After this Edge and Orton also became rivals in their goals of achieving the WWE Championship. Neither Edge nor Orton won the championship, and they lost their claims as number one contenders after a failed match with Cena at Backlash on April 29.

La Familia (2007–2009) 

On the May 7 episode of Raw, Edge interrupted an in-ring promo by the winner of the 2007 Money in the Bank contract, Mr. Kennedy. Kennedy had said for weeks that he would not cash in the contract until the following WrestleMania, but Edge decided to goad him into a match for his briefcase. Edge attacked Kennedy before the match even started, severely injuring his shoulder, and took advantage of the injury to beat Kennedy and take the briefcase. Edge thus became the first person to gain the Money in the Bank contract twice and the first not to do so in the ladder match.

On the May 11 episode of SmackDown!, World Heavyweight Champion The Undertaker retained his title against Batista in a steel cage match. Then, Mark Henry attacked the Undertaker. Despite being part of the Raw roster, Edge would appear and cash in his Money in the Bank contract on an injured Undertaker. After two spears, Edge pinned the Undertaker for the victory and his first World Heavyweight Championship. As a result, Edge became a member of the SmackDown! roster. Edge then began a feud with Batista and successfully defended his championship title against him at Judgment Day on May 20, in a Steel Cage match at One Night Stand on June 3, and a third and final time by count out in a last chance match at Vengeance on June 24. Edge then began a feud with Kane after SmackDown! General Manager Theodore Long announced Kane as the new number one contender for the World Heavyweight Championship. Edge was forced to relinquish the World Heavyweight Championship due to a legitimately torn left pectoral muscle injury on the July 20 episode of SmackDown! following an attack by Kane a week earlier.

On November 18, at Survivor Series, Edge made his return, interfering in a World Heavyweight Championship Hell in a Cell match between Batista and The Undertaker, helping Batista win the match. The following SmackDown! show saw Edge and General Manager Vickie Guerrero make their relationship public, making his official in-ring return in a World Heavyweight Championship match against Batista on the November 30 episode of SmackDown!, a match that ended after The Undertaker interfered. At Armageddon, Edge won his second World Heavyweight Championship, after giving The Undertaker two chair shots and pinning the defending champion Batista (who had been Tombstoned by Undertaker prior) in a Triple Threat match. During the match, Edge used two look-a-likes to distract Batista and The Undertaker. It was later revealed that these look-a-likes were the Major Brothers, who were then repackaged as Curt Hawkins and Zack Ryder. Edge also formed an alliance with Chavo Guerrero Jr., nephew of Vickie Guerrero, and on the January 22, 2008 broadcast of ECW, he assisted Chavo in winning the ECW Championship from CM Punk. This group eventually came under the name of La Familia (Spanish for "The Family"). Edge then successfully defended the World Heavyweight Championship over Rey Mysterio at the Royal Rumble and again No Way Out in February. Also that month, he proposed to Vickie, which she accepted.

At WrestleMania XXIV in March, Edge lost the World Heavyweight Championship to the Undertaker when he tapped out to the Hell's Gate. In a WrestleMania rematch, The Undertaker defeated Edge once again at Backlash to retain the World Heavyweight Championship. Following Backlash, the Undertaker was stripped of the World Heavyweight Championship by Vickie Guerrero for using the Hell's Gate, which she previously banned. After winning a tournament to determine who would face the Undertaker for the vacant championship, the two met at Judgment Day, which ended in Edge losing via countout. However, since championships cannot change hands via countout, no champion was crowned. A rematch was scheduled for One Night Stand, in a TLC match. On the May 23 episode of SmackDown, Vickie Guerrero added a stipulation that stated if the Undertaker were to lose, he would be kayfabe banished from the WWE. At One Night Stand on June 1, Edge would defeat the Undertaker after interference from Chavo Guerrero and Bam Neely, in the process winning the World Heavyweight Championship for the third time. Since he lost, the Undertaker was also forced to leave the company.

On June 29, Edge retained his championship against Batista at Night of Champions, after interference from La Familia. The next night on Raw, Edge appeared to gloat that two of the top championships were on SmackDown, as WWE Champion Triple H was drafted to SmackDown in the WWE draft earlier that week. A vengeful Batista then appeared and incapacitated Edge with the Batista Bomb. Just as Batista was leaving, CM Punk ran to the ring carrying his Money in the Bank briefcase, with referee in tow, who then cashed in the briefcase. Edge, who was still knocked down from the attack by Batista, was easily pinned by Punk after a Go To Sleep, losing the World Heavyweight Championship in the process. Due to this win, the championship became exclusive to the Raw brand.

On the July 4 episode of SmackDown, Edge took his frustrations out on Vickie because he lost the title and told her the wedding was off. The following week, however, after Guerrero saved Edge from a con-chair-to by The Big Show, Edge re-proposed, and the wedding was back on. On the July 18 episode of SmackDown, at the wedding reception, Triple H came out and showed a video of Edge cheating on Guerrero the day before with the wedding planner, Alicia Fox. At The Great American Bash on July 20, Edge faced Triple H for the WWE Championship in a losing effort. Edge attempted to apologize to Guerrero, but she revealed to him that she had rehired The Undertaker and that Edge would face him in a Hell in a Cell match at SummerSlam. Edge then turned on La Familia during the August 8 episode of SmackDown, performing a one-man con-chair-to on Chavo Guerrero in the ring, and tossed Vickie out of her wheelchair, effectively disbanding the faction. At SummerSlam on August 17, The Undertaker defeated Edge, and after the match, Undertaker chokeslammed Edge off the top of a ladder and through the ring canvas, with flames rising from the hole.

On November 23, at Survivor Series, Edge returned to WWE after an introduction by SmackDown General Manager and his on-screen wife Vickie Guerrero, replacing Jeff Hardy in the Triple Threat match for the WWE Championship involving champion Triple H and Vladimir Kozlov. He pinned Triple H to become the WWE Champion for the third time in his career. Edge lost the title to Hardy at Armageddon on December 14 in a triple threat match, which also featured Triple H. At the Royal Rumble on January 25, 2009, however, Edge regained the title in a no disqualification match, following Matt Hardy's interference. At No Way Out on February 15, Edge lost the WWE Championship in an Elimination Chamber match after being pinned by Jeff Hardy, being the first to be eliminated, with the title eventually being won by Triple H. Later that night, Edge inserted himself into the World Heavyweight Championship Elimination Chamber match after attacking Kofi Kingston and barricading himself inside one of the chamber's pods, proceeding to win his fourth World Heavyweight Championship, last eliminating Rey Mysterio and taking the title over to SmackDown. At WrestleMania 25 on April 5, Edge lost the championship to John Cena in a Triple Threat match, which also included Big Show, but regained the championship for a fifth time at Backlash on April 26, when he defeated Cena in a Last Man Standing match, after interference by Big Show. After a successful defense against Jeff Hardy at Judgment Day on May 17, he lost the title to Hardy at Extreme Rules on June 7 in a ladder match. While Hardy was celebrating, CM Punk cashed in his Money in the Bank and defeated Hardy to win the World Heavyweight Championship. The following night on Raw, Guerrero resigned as the Raw General Manager due to being humiliated, and Edge came out to apologize. Instead, however, he confessed he married Guerrero only because she had authoritative powers as the General Manager, and sought a divorce. On the June 15 episode of Raw, Edge received his rematch for the World Heavyweight Championship in a triple threat match against both Hardy and Punk, but was pinned by Punk.

Edge won the Unified WWE Tag Team Championship (the unified version of the World Tag Team Championship from the Raw brand and the WWE Tag Team Championship from the SmackDown brand) with Chris Jericho at The Bash on June 28 after he and Jericho were inserted into what was originally a match between reigning champions The Colóns and Legacy. The win made Edge a record setting 12 time World Tag Team Champion. On July 3, Edge suffered a torn Achilles tendon while competing at a live event in San Diego in a match against Jeff Hardy, and later underwent surgery. It was reported that he could be out of action for up to a year. During Edge's absence, Jericho replaced him with Big Show (forming Jeri-Show) and Jericho began to speak badly of Edge, mocking him for his injury.

Record-breaking World Heavyweight Champion (2010–2011) 
At the Royal Rumble pay-per-view event on January 31, 2010, Edge returned from injury by entering the Royal Rumble match as the twenty ninth surprise entrant, where he won the Royal Rumble match for the first time in his career, after last eliminating John Cena. At Elimination Chamber on February 21, after Chris Jericho won the World Heavyweight Championship, Edge challenged Jericho for the World Heavyweight Championship at WrestleMania XXVI after a surprise attack on Jericho, turning face for the first time since 2004. At WrestleMania on March 28, Edge failed to win the title. Edge defeated Jericho in a steel cage match at Extreme Rules on April 25, ending their feud.

On April 26, as part of 2010 WWE draft, Edge was drafted to the Raw brand, also costing Randy Orton a title shot, by spearing him in a triple threat match against Batista and Sheamus. On the April 30 episode of SmackDown, Edge said goodbye to the SmackDown fans. However, Edge turned on the fans by calling them "puppets" for chanting for him and later tried a sneak attack on his former tag team partner Christian, thus turning heel once again. Edge began a feud with Randy Orton, with both Edge and Orton gaining the upper hand over one another. Much of the antagonism stemmed of Orton's refusal to re-form Rated-RKO with Edge, as Edge wanted to pursue the tag team titles he had been stripped of. Edge and Orton met in a match at the Over the Limit pay-per-view on May 23, with the match resulting in a double countout. At Fatal 4-Way on June 20, Edge participated in a fatal four-way match that also included Orton, John Cena, and Sheamus for the WWE Championship, though Edge failed to win the title. Edge then participated in the Raw Money in the Bank ladder match at the Money in the Bank pay-per-view on July 18, but failed to win the briefcase, as it was won by The Miz. Edge then went on to participate in the main event of SummerSlam on August 15 in a seven-on-seven elimination tag team match against The Nexus. Although he was eliminated by Heath Slater, his team were victorious. On the 900th episode of Raw, Edge disqualified himself in the main event in a five-on-five elimination match against The Nexus. This saw him enter into a feud with the anonymous Raw General Manager, during which the general manager cost him several matches. At Night of Champions on September 19, Edge participated in a six-pack elimination challenge for the WWE Championship, but once again failed to win the title.

At the Hell in a Cell pay-per-view on October 3, Edge defeated Jack Swagger. The next night on Raw, he was traded back to SmackDown for CM Punk, due to him destroying the Anonymous Raw General Manager's computer, thus turning face once again in the process. On the October 15 episode of SmackDown, he defeated Dolph Ziggler to become part of Team SmackDown at Bragging Rights. At Bragging Rights on October 24, Edge won the match for Team SmackDown alongside Rey Mysterio, eliminating R-Truth, John Morrison and The Miz.

On the October 29 episode of SmackDown, Edge defeated Rey Mysterio and Alberto Del Rio to become the number one contender for the World Heavyweight Championship at Survivor Series. On the November 12 episode of SmackDown, Edge lost his match with David Otunga, thanks to Paul Bearer's interference. Edge then kidnapped Bearer and used him to cost Kane his match with Big Show. The following week, Edge tortured Paul Bearer, forcing him to play dodgeball and force feeding him, planning to wear down Kane. He then ambushed Kane in the garage when he was a few feet from Paul Bearer and drove away with his hostage. At Survivor Series on November 21, Edge failed to win the title after the referee determined the match a draw, due to both men pinning each other at the same time. On December 19, 2010, Edge defeated Kane, Rey Mysterio, and Alberto Del Rio in a Tables, Ladders, and Chairs match at TLC: Tables, Ladders & Chairs to win the World Heavyweight Championship for a record sixth time and making him a ten time World Champion. Edge then defended the World Heavyweight Championship against Kane in a winning effort in a Last Man Standing match on the January 7 episode of SmackDown, thus ending their feud.

At the Royal Rumble on January 30, 2011, Edge successfully defended his World Heavyweight Championship against Dolph Ziggler. On the 600th episode of SmackDown on February 18, acting General Manager Guerrero fired Edge in storyline, and awarded the World Heavyweight Championship to her on-screen boyfriend Ziggler. SmackDown General Manager Theodore Long returned later that night, and rehired Edge. Edge then defeated Ziggler to become the World Heavyweight Champion for the record seventh and final time, his 11th world championship overall. At the Elimination Chamber pay-per-view on February 20, Edge successfully defended his World Heavyweight Championship in an Elimination Chamber match by finally pinning Rey Mysterio. After he won the match, he was attacked by Royal Rumble winner Alberto Del Rio, but was saved by the returning Christian. Edge and Christian briefly reunited to defeat Del Rio and his bodyguard Brodus Clay on the March 11 episode of SmackDown. At WrestleMania XXVII on April 3, Edge successfully defended the World Heavyweight Championship against Del Rio.

First retirement and WWE Hall of Famer (2011–2019) 
On the April 11, 2011, episode of Raw, Edge gave an emotional speech about his career and the realities of wrestling. He reflected upon his previous neck injury and cervical vertebral fusion, and stated that he had felt numbness in his arms. He passed basic-strength tests prior to WrestleMania, but WWE had urged him for further testing and an MRI result forced him to retire. This was diagnosed as cervical spinal stenosis, and doctors would not clear him to compete, for risk of neck-down paralysis or even death should he take a hard enough fall. Later that same week on the April 15 episode of SmackDown, Edge officially relinquished the World Heavyweight Championship, retiring as the World Heavyweight Champion in the process of recapping his announcement and expressing gratitude over this happening now rather than it being too late.

On the April 22 episode of SmackDown, Edge interrupted Alberto Del Rio's mock retirement party for him. At Extreme Rules on May 1, Edge helped his friend Christian to win the vacant World Heavyweight Championship. At SummerSlam on August 14, Edge was in Christian's corner for his World Heavyweight Championship defense against Randy Orton but, disappointed by the cowardly tactics Christian used to win his second World Heavyweight Championship, berated him and walked out on him. Christian then lost the title to Orton for a second time. On the September 16 episode of SmackDown, in his hometown of Toronto, Edge hosted The Cutting Edge between Mark Henry and the World Heavyweight Champion, Randy Orton. After the show went off the air, they held Edge Appreciation Night to celebrate his career.

On March 31, 2012, Edge was inducted into the WWE Hall of Fame by Christian, during WrestleMania XXVIII weekend. Edge made a surprise appearance on the April 23, 2012 episode of Raw, confronting his long-time rival John Cena about Brock Lesnar. On the September 21, 2012 episode of SmackDown, Edge made an appearance addressing Team Hell No. Edge returned on the September 9, 2013, episode of Raw in his hometown of Toronto where he hosted his talk show The Cutting Edge having Daniel Bryan as his special guest. 

Edge insulted Triple H in the segment, who retaliated by sending The Shield to attack Edge's friend Christian. Later that week, Edge hosted The Cutting Edge on the September 13 episode of SmackDown, where he mocked Randy Orton and watched as Orton's attack on Bryan backfired. Edge and Christian hosted the December 29, 2014 episode of Raw, where they held the first ever Cutting Edge Peep Show interviewing Seth Rollins, who, along with Big Show, attacked them.  Rollins held Edge hostage, thus forcing John Cena to reinstate the Authority. When Rollins tried to break Edge's neck anyway, Cena ended up making the save. Edge would return on the January 2 episode of SmackDown and with The Authority back in power, apologised to the pair for the Seth Rollins attack. 

Edge and Christian appeared in a backstage segment on the September 7 episode of Raw, where they were seen playing their trademark kazoos after a confrontation with Rollins. They would later become involved in an altercation with The New Day and The Dudley Boyz. In 2016, Edge and Christian began hosting the WWE Network Show, "The Edge and Christian Show That Totally Reeks of Awesomeness", a second season would eventually go on to air. 

On February 15, 2016 it was announced Edge and Christian would host an installment of "The Cutting Edge Peep Show" at Fastlane with The New Day as their special guests. At the event, Edge and Christian joined forces with The New Day against The League of Nations with The New Day completing a 'Face turn'. On November 15, 2016, on the 900th episode of SmackDown, Edge hosted a special edition of The Cutting Edge with the men's SmackDown Survivor Series team members as his guests and was later interrupted by the returning Undertaker. He later reunited with his 'Edgeheads' Zack Ryder and Curt Hawkins.  Edge was present at the WWE Hall of Fame ceremoney in 2017 as his wife Beth Phoenix was inducted. On April 7, 2018, Edge and Christian inducted the Dudley Boyz into the WWE Hall of Fame.  Later that year on October 16 at the 1,000th episode of SmackDown, Edge hosted The Cutting Edge with SmackDown Women's Champion Becky Lynch as his guest.

At the SummerSlam pay-per-view event on August 11, 2019, Edge interrupted Elias' performance and performed a spear on him, engaging in physical wrestling for the first time since his retirement. This sparked rumors that Edge had been medically cleared to wrestle, which he denied.

In-ring return and Universal Championship pursuits (2020–2022) 
At the 2020 Royal Rumble on January 26, Edge entered the Men's Royal Rumble match at the number 21 spot to the loudest crowd reaction of the show, competing in his first professional wrestling match after a nine-year retirement. He eliminated three participants, including former teammate Randy Orton, before being eliminated by Roman Reigns. The following night on Raw, Edge was attacked by Orton, leading to a Last Man Standing match between them on the second night of WrestleMania 36 on April 5, which Edge won. They had another match at Backlash on June 14, where Orton was victorious. During the match, Edge suffered a torn triceps and it was reported that the injury would sideline him for four to eight months. After a seven-month hiatus, Edge returned on the January 25, 2021 episode of Raw, where he declared that he would enter the 2021 Royal Rumble match, which he won after entering first, by last eliminating Orton. With this victory, Edge became the eighth man to win the Royal Rumble match twice, the third to win it from the number one position, and the first to win it after being inducted into the WWE Hall of Fame. The following night on Raw, Edge, with the help of Alexa Bliss, defeated Orton to end their feud.

At Elimination Chamber on February 21, Edge attacked WWE Universal Champion Roman Reigns with the spear, making his decision to face him at WrestleMania 37. At Fastlane on March 21, Edge attacked Daniel Bryan, costing him the title. On the March 26 episode of SmackDown, Daniel Bryan was added to the match, making it a triple threat match. On the second night of WrestleMania 37 on April 11, Edge ultimately lost the match to Reigns following the assistance from Jey Uso, thus becoming the first person to win the Royal Rumble twice and lose both championship matches at WrestleMania. After a two-month hiatus, Edge made his return on the June 25 episode of SmackDown, attacking both Reigns and Jimmy Uso. The following day on Talking Smack, it was announced that Edge would face Reigns for the Universal Championship at Money in the Bank. At Money in the Bank on July 18, Edge was unsuccessful in capturing the title due to interference from Seth Rollins. 

Over the following weeks, Edge and Rollins kept confronting and attacking each other until the August 6 episode of SmackDown, where Edge would challenge Rollins to a match at SummerSlam, which Rollins accepted. At SummerSlam on August 21, Edge defeated Rollins by submission. Edge would then face Rollins on the September 10 episode of SmackDown where Rollins would win and attack Edge post-match in order to hospitalize him. As part of the 2021 Draft, Edge was drafted to the Raw brand. On the October 8 episode of SmackDown, Edge challenged Rollins to a Hell in a Cell match at Crown Jewel after Rollins broke into his house the previous week. At Crown Jewel on October 21, Edge subsequently defeated Rollins to end their feud. Edge returned on the November 29 episode of Raw, where he was confronted by The Miz. The following week on Raw, after another heated verbal exchange between the two during a Miz TV segment, Miz challenged Edge to a match at Day 1, with Edge accepting. At Day 1 on January 1, 2022, Edge defeated Miz with help from his wife, Beth Phoenix. At Royal Rumble on January 29, Edge and his wife Beth Phoenix defeated The Miz and Maryse in a mixed tag team match.

Storyline with The Judgment Day (2022–present)

 
On the February 21 episode of Raw, Edge reflected on all the WrestleMania moments in his career and then he issued an open challenge for WrestleMania 38. The following week on Raw, his challenge was accepted by AJ Styles, but Edge viciously attacked him, turning heel for the first time since 2010. During the buildup to WrestleMania, Edge debuted a new gimmick and a new entrance theme, The Other Side by Alter Bridge. On the second night of WrestleMania 38 on April 3, Edge defeated Styles following a distraction by Damian Priest. Edge formed a faction with Priest named The Judgment Day, where Edge claimed to wipe out anyone who did not fit in their "Mountain of Omnipotence". At WrestleMania Backlash on May 8, Edge defeated Styles with the help of Rhea Ripley, who became the newest member of The Judgment Day. At Hell in a Cell on June 5, The Judgment Day defeated Styles, Finn Bálor and Liv Morgan in a six-person mixed tag team match. The next night on Raw, Edge introduced Bálor as the newest member of The Judgment Day. Almost immediately, Bálor, Priest and Ripley suddenly turned on their leader, attacking Edge with his own signature con-chair-to move and kicking him out of the group. Edge turned face once again in the process.

At SummerSlam on July 30, Edge returned to help The Mysterios (Rey and Dominik) win their No Disqualification match against The Judgment Day, cementing his face turn. He also returned with his original theme song Metalingus by Alter Bridge on the following episode of Raw. At Clash at the Castle on September 3, Edge teamed up with Rey Mysterio for the first time in nearly 20 years to defeat The Judgment Day. After the match however, Dominik attacked Edge with a low blow and clotheslined his father Rey.  At Extreme Rules on October 8, Edge was defeated by Bálor in an "I Quit" match after interference from The Judgment Day. After he said "I Quit", Ripley attacked his wife, Beth Phoenix (who also interfered during the match on his behalf), with a violent con-chair-to, severely injuring her (kayfabe) and suffering his first loss in 2022. After a three-month hiatus, Edge made his return at the Royal Rumble on January 28, 2023 at #24 eliminating Bálor and Priest before being eliminated by them after a distraction from Dominik Mysterio. At Elimination Chamber on February 18, Edge and Phoenix defeated Bálor and Ripley in a mixed tag team match despite interference from Dominik. In a press conference after the event, Edge answered Austin Theory's open challenge for the United States Championship, marking his first title opportunity since  Money in the Bank in 2021. On the following episode of Raw, Edge failed to win the title after interference from Bálor.

Professional wrestling style and persona

Edge utilizes the spear as his finisher. WWE announcer Michael Cole praised the psychology Edge included in the move, since "he knew that the longer he made the audience wait, the better it was going to be". He has also performed other finishers including a lifting DDT called the Edgecution, and an inverted sharpshooter submission hold called the Edgecator.

In 2006, after performing a segment with Lita where they had sex in the ring, Edge began to use the nickname of "The Rated R Superstar". He is also nicknamed "The Ultimate Opportunist" due to how he used the Money in the Bank briefcase to win World Titles.

In 2012, WWE voted him as both the third best World Heavyweight Champion and 20th best wrestling villain in WWE history. His entrance theme, "Metalingus" by Alter Bridge, was selected as the greatest in WWE history by the company in a 2013 list.

Acting career 
In 2000, Copeland had a cameo appearance as a road bandit in the fantasy movie Highlander: Endgame. In March 2002, he appeared with other wrestlers on the quiz show Weakest Link. He was voted out in the first round, and the eventual winner was Kane. On the August 6, 2006 episode of Mind of Mencia, he appeared as Edge as a commentator for "The Royal Religious Rumble". He punched out an actor playing L. Ron Hubbard to stop Scientology from ruling the world and then speared another actor playing Tom Cruise.

In March 2007, Copeland appeared alongside Randy Orton, John Cena, and Bobby Lashley on Deal or No Deal. Weeks later, he appeared on the sketch comedy show MADtv. He appeared in a Slim Jim commercial, in which his "spicy side" caused chaos in a DMV, a restaurant, and a hotel. Edge: a Decade of Decadence, a DVD documentary of Copeland's life, was released in December 2008. The DVD illustrates his wrestling career dating from when he entered the WWF to 2008.

In June 2011, Copeland appeared as Thelo, an Abnormal, in the Sanctuary episode "Into the Black". In September 2011, he held an "Edgucational" Essay Scholarship Contest, as an echo back to how he himself got a start in the wrestling business. The scholarship went to one of the students at Squared Circle Wrestling in Toronto, Alysha Verhoven, who has since gone on to work as Leah von Dutch.

Copeland appeared regularly in the Syfy series Haven, which started in July 2011, as Dwight Hendrickson, a troubled man whose affliction is revealed to be attracting bullets and who works as a cleaner, cleaning up after the troubles. He is later appointed the Chief of Police. He was part of the cast until the show's series finale in December 2015.

WWE Studios released Bending the Rules, in which Copeland starred, in 2012. WWE released the official trailer of the film on the February 28, 2012 episode of Raw. The 2012 documentary, You Think You Know Me  The Story of Edge, includes a look at Copeland's life and career in pro wrestling.

On September 4, 2013, Copeland hosted a special episode of the Syfy series Ghost Mine.

In December 2014, Copeland made a cameo appearance in the music video for the In-Flight Safety song "Destroy" as his Dwight Hendrickson character.

In July 2015, Copeland was nominated for a Golden Maple Award for Best Actor in a TV series which was broadcast in the U.S. for his role in Haven as Dwight Hendrickson.

On July 16, 2015, it was announced that Copeland would be set to portray Atom-Smasher in the second season of The Flash.

On February 21, 2016, Copeland and Christian began starring on The Edge and Christian Show That Totally Reeks of Awesomeness, a series on the WWE Network.

On July 14, 2016, Copeland starred in the Canadian television series Private Eyes where he played Ben Fisk.

On July 26, 2016, it was announced that Copeland would play Kjetill Flatnose on Season 5 and 6 of the Vikings in a recurring role. The series ended December 30, 2020.

On October 13, 2022, it was announced that Copeland would play Ares in the Percy Jackson and the Olympians TV series adaptation of the original book series, streaming on Disney+.

Other media 
His autobiography, Adam Copeland on Edge, was released on November 2, 2004. Unlike most wrestlers who used "ghostwriters" to write their biographies, Copeland wrote the entire book himself, in longhand. Mick Foley, who also wrote his wrestling autobiography himself in longhand, wrote the foreword to his book.

In March 2016, Copeland appeared on CBC's Canada Reads competition where he championed the book Minister Without Portfolio by the English-born Canadian writer and author Michael Winter.

From March 2017 to September 2019, Copeland co-hosted the E&C's Pod of Awesomeness podcast with Christian. He has since left the podcast.

On August 21, 2022, "Edge" was the subject of the Biography: WWE Legends.

Video games

Personal life 
Copeland lives in Asheville, North Carolina. He began a relationship with Alannah Morley, the sister of wrestler Val Venis, in 1998; they married on November 8, 2001, and divorced on March 10, 2004. He married Lisa Ortiz on October 21, 2004. Soon after marrying her, he began an affair with wrestler Lita, who was dating his friend Matt Hardy. The affair became public knowledge in February 2005, resulting in Copeland and Ortiz divorcing on November 17, 2005. Copeland and wrestler Beth Phoenix had a daughter named Lyric on December 12, 2013. They had a second daughter named Ruby on May 31, 2016. They were married on October 30, 2016 (his 43rd birthday).

Copeland is a lifelong close friend of wrestler Christian. He is a fan of the Toronto Maple Leafs and New Jersey Devils ice hockey teams, and used to play ice hockey with retired NHL player Aaron Downey. He has said that he smoked one cigarette when he was 16, hated it, and has not smoked since. He has several tattoos including a red and black sun on his left upper biceps which covers a former tattoo of a muscular shark, a star on his right upper biceps with several smaller stars and two skulls wearing bandanas adorned with flowers and hearts, a cross on his left forearm, and a scroll adorned with the words "Rise Above". All of his tattoos represent a stage in his career.

In March 2007, Sports Illustrated investigated a steroid and human growth hormone (hGH) ring used by a number of professional athletes in several sports. An article mentioned several current and former WWE wrestlers, including Copeland, who was alleged to have obtained hGH. Copeland previously admitted to using steroids in April 2004 as an experiment after neck surgery, but said he felt like they slowed him down so he quickly stopped using them. According to Copeland, he took hGH after returning from a spinal fusion neck surgery because doctors told him that it would help the bones grow back around the screws and plate that were inserted into his neck. A Sports Illustrated article in August 2007 named Copeland as one of 10 wrestlers who were found to have purchased steroids and other drugs from an online pharmacy in violation of WWE's Talent Wellness program. He was said to have received the growth hormones somatropin and genotropin, as well as the steroid stanozolol, between September 2004 and February 2007.

Filmography

Championships and accomplishments 

 The Baltimore Sun
 Best Feud of the Decade (2000s) 
 Canadian Wrestling Association
 CWA North American Championship (1 time)
 Cauliflower Alley Club
 Men's Wrestling Award (2013)
 CBS Sports
 Best Moment of the Year (2020) 
 Promo of the Year (2020) 
 Insane Championship Wrestling
 ICW Street Fight Tag Team Championship (2 times) – with Christian Cage (1) and Joe E. Legend (1)
 MWCW Tag Team Championship (1 time) – with Joe E. Legend
 George Tragos/Lou Thesz Professional Wrestling Hall of Fame
 Lou Thesz Award (2013)
 Pro Wrestling Illustrated
 Comeback of the Year (2004)
 Feud of the Year (2005) 
 Feud of the Year (2006) 
 Match of the Year (2000) 
 Match of the Year (2001) 
 Most Hated Wrestler of the Year (2006)
 Most Improved Wrestler of the Year (2001)
 Inspirational Wrestler of the Year (2021)
 Ranked No. 2 of the top 500 singles wrestlers in the PWI 500 in 2007
Tokyo Pro Wrestling
CCW Tag Team Championship (1 time) - with Ken Johnson
CCW Tag Team Championship Tournament (1998) - with Ken Johnson
 Wrestling Observer Newsletter
 Match of the Year (2002) 
 Tag Team of the Year (2000) 
 Worst Feud of the Year (2010) 
 Worst Worked Match of the Year (2008) 
 WWE/World Wrestling Entertainment/Federation
 WWE Championship (4 times)
 World Heavyweight Championship (7 times)
 WWF/E Intercontinental Championship (5 times)
 WCW United States Championship (1 time)
 World Tag Team Championship (12 times) – with Christian (7), Hollywood Hulk Hogan (1), Chris Benoit (2), Randy Orton (1) and Chris Jericho (1)
 WWE Tag Team Championship (2 times) – with Rey Mysterio Jr. (1) and Chris Jericho (1)
 King of the Ring (2001)
 Money in the Bank (2005, inaugural)
 Royal Rumble (2010, 2021)
 Fourteenth Triple Crown Champion
 Third Grand Slam Champion (under the current format, Thirteenth overall)
Bragging Rights Trophy (2010) – with Team SmackDown (Big Show, Rey Mysterio, Jack Swagger, Alberto Del Rio, Kofi Kingston and Tyler Reks)
 Championship Chase Tournament (2008)
 Gold Rush Tournament (2005)
 Slammy Award (4 times)
 Couple of the Year (2008) – with Vickie Guerrero
 "Oh Snap" Meltdown of the Year (2010) – 
 Return of the Year (2020)
 Rivalry of the Year (2020) – with Randy Orton
 WWE Hall of Fame (Class of 2012)

Luchas de Apuestas record

Notes

References

Sources

External links 

 
 
 
 

1973 births
20th-century professional wrestlers
20th-century Canadian male actors
21st-century professional wrestlers
21st-century Canadian male actors
Canadian colour commentators
Canadian expatriate male actors in the United States
Canadian expatriate professional wrestlers in the United States
Canadian male film actors
Canadian male professional wrestlers
Canadian male television actors
Canadian male voice actors
Canadian podcasters
Living people
Male actors from Toronto
NWA/WCW/WWE United States Heavyweight Champions
People from Orangeville, Ontario
Professional wrestlers from Toronto
Professional wrestling podcasters
WWE Champions
WWE Grand Slam champions
WWE Hall of Fame inductees
WWF/WWE Intercontinental Champions
WWF/WWE King Crown's Champions/King of the Ring winners
World Heavyweight Champions (WWE)